Halorubrum ezzemoulense is a halophilic archaeon in the family of Halorubraceae.

References

Euryarchaeota
Archaea described in 2006